Lech Poklewski (born 29 January 1937) is a Polish sailor. He competed in the Dragon event at the 1972 Summer Olympics.

References

External links
 

1937 births
Living people
Polish male sailors (sport)
Olympic sailors of Poland
Sailors at the 1972 Summer Olympics – Dragon
Sportspeople from Vilnius
People from Wilno Voivodeship (1926–1939)